Mordellistena fuscoatra is a beetle in the genus Mordellistena of the family Mordellidae. It was described in 1864 by Helmuth.

References

fuscoatra
Beetles described in 1864